Pavel Badea (born 10 June 1967) is a Romanian retired footballer who played as a midfielder.  He played professionally in Romania, Switzerland, South Korea and Japan.

Playing career
Badea began his professional football career with FC Universitatea Craiova, making his league debut in 1984. He left Romania to play for FC Lausanne-Sport of Switzerland in the summer of 1992, later moving to Korea Republic to play for Suwon Samsung Bluewings from 1996 to 1998. He spent the next several seasons in Japan playing for Bellmare Hiratsuka, Kashiwa Reysol and Avispa Fukuoka in the J1 League. He returned to Romania in December 2001, where he finished his career with FC Extensiv Craiova and FC Universitatea Craiova.

Badea made nine appearances for the senior Romania national football team from 1990 to 1992.

Coaching career
Badea managed FC Universitatea Craiova for 7 league matches during 2003. He returned for a second spell at the club in the 2004–05 season.

Club statistics

National team statistics

European Cups statistics
14 matches - 0 goals 

UEFA Cup Winners' Cup 1985–86 : 4 matches 0 goals
UEFA Cup 1987–88 : 2 matches 0 goals
UEFA Cup 1990–91 : 4 matches 0 goals
European Cup 1991–92 : 2 matches 0 goals
UEFA Cup 1995–96 : 2 matches 0 goals

International matches 
9 matches - 2 goals

Honours

Club

Universitatea Craiova
Romanian League: 1990–91
Romanian Cup: 1990–91

Suwon Samsung Bluewings
K League 1: 1998
K League 1 Runner-up: 1996
Korean FA Cup Runner-up: 1996
Asian Cup Winners' Cup Runner-up: 1997–98

Kashiwa Reysol
J.League Cup: 1999

Individual
K League Best XI: 1996

References

Bibliography

External links
 

 

1967 births
Living people
Association football midfielders
Romanian footballers
Romania international footballers
CS Universitatea Craiova players
FC U Craiova 1948 players
FC Lausanne-Sport players
Suwon Samsung Bluewings players
Shonan Bellmare players
Kashiwa Reysol players
Avispa Fukuoka players
Liga I players
Swiss Super League players
K League 1 players
J1 League players
Sportspeople from Craiova
Romanian football managers
Romanian expatriate footballers
Expatriate footballers in Japan
Romanian expatriate sportspeople in Japan
Expatriate footballers in South Korea
Romanian expatriate sportspeople in South Korea
Expatriate footballers in Switzerland
Romanian expatriate sportspeople in Switzerland
FC U Craiova 1948 managers